Bagh Safa Rural District is a rural district (dehestan) in Sarchehan District, Bavanat County, Fars Province, Iran. At the 2006 census, its population was 4,432, in 1,055 families.  The rural district has 23 villages.

References 

Rural Districts of Fars Province
Bavanat County